John Stigerwalt House is a historic home located near Bostian Heights, Rowan County, North Carolina.  It was built in 1811, and is a two-story, brick dwelling associated with the German settlement of piedmont North Carolina.  It features bold diamond-pattern brickwork and a handsome clock/sundial on the front elevation.  Also on the property are the contributing frame smokehouse, frame corn crib, (c. 1920), and the remains of a granite well base.

It was listed on the National Register of Historic Places in 1984.

References

Houses on the National Register of Historic Places in North Carolina
Houses completed in 1811
Houses in Rowan County, North Carolina
National Register of Historic Places in Rowan County, North Carolina